Kenmoor is an unincorporated community in Buchanan County, in the U.S. state of Missouri.

History
A post office called Kenmoor was established in 1886, and remained in operation until 1904. The community was named for a local businessman in the telephony industry.

References

Unincorporated communities in Buchanan County, Missouri
Unincorporated communities in Missouri